Vice Admiral Arnaud de Tarlé is a French Navy officer, currently serving as Chief of the French Navy.

References

Living people
French Navy admirals
Year of birth missing (living people)